Mika Kallio
  Hideo Kanaya
  Takazumi Katayama
  Daijiro Kato
  Ken Kavanagh
  John Kocinski
  Pentti Korhonen
  Tomoyoshi Koyama
  Ewald Kluge
  Bruno Kneubühler
  Randy Krummenacher
  Hiroaki Kuzuhara

 K